Giovanni de Rosso (died 1493) was a Roman Catholic prelate who served as Bishop of Alatri (1478–1493).

Biography
On 14 Jan 1478, Giovanni de Rosso was appointed during the papacy of Pope Sixtus IV as Bishop of Alatri.
He served as Bishop of Alatri until his death in 1493. While bishop, he was the principal consecrator of Martin Johann Lintfari, Bishop of Žemaičiai (1492) .

References

External links and additional sources
 (for Chronology of Bishops) 
 (for Chronology of Bishops)  

15th-century Italian Roman Catholic bishops
Bishops appointed by Pope Sixtus IV
1493 deaths